The 2020–21 Rice Owls men's basketball team represented the Rice University during the 2020–21 NCAA Division I men's basketball season. The team was led by fourth-year head coach Scott Pera, and played their home games at Tudor Fieldhouse in Houston, Texas as members of Conference USA.

Previous season
The Owls finished the 2019–20 season 15–17, 7–11 in C-USA play to finish in 12th place. They lost in the first round of the C-USA tournament to FIU.

Roster

Schedule and results

|-
!colspan=12 style=|Non-conference regular season

|-
!colspan=12 style=|CUSA regular season

|-
!colspan=9 style=| Conference USA tournament

|-

See also
 2020–21 Rice Owls women's basketball team

Notes

References

Rice Owls men's basketball seasons
Rice Owls
Rice men's basketball
Rice men's basketball